Benalúa is a city located in the province of Granada, Spain. According to the 2006 census (INE), the city has a population of 3311 inhabitants.

References

Municipalities in the Province of Granada